Arnold van der Vin is an Indonesian former footballer who played as a goalkeeper. Born in Semarang and nicknamed Nol, he made several appearances for the Indonesia national team.

Career
Van der Vin was the second player after Mo Heng Tan to play in goal for newly independent Indonesia. He made his unofficial debut for Indonesia in a match against South China AA of Hong Kong on 27 July 1952.

In 1955, he earned a transfer to Fortuna '54, to replace the injured Frans de Munck, then the goalkeeper of the Netherlands national team. The next year, he returned to play for PSMS Medan.

References
 Herfiyana, Novan; Morrison, Neil; Stokkermans, Karel. "Young Yugoslavia tour of Indonesia 1953". 
RSSSF, 7 March 2013. Retrieved on 18 August 2013.

Year of birth missing (living people)
Living people
Indonesian footballers
Indo people
People from Semarang
Naturalised citizens of Indonesia
Indonesian people of Dutch descent
Sportspeople from Central Java
Association football goalkeepers
Indonesia international footballers
Excelsior Rotterdam players
Persija Jakarta players
PSMS Medan players
Fortuna Sittard players
Penang F.C. players